Tomáš Pavelka (born May 29, 1993) is a Czech professional ice hockey defenceman currently playing under contract with Lukko in the Finnish Liiga. He originally played with HC Vítkovice in the Czech Extraliga during the 2010–11 Czech Extraliga season.

References

External links

1993 births
Czech ice hockey defencemen
Living people
HC Litvínov players
Lukko players
P.E.I. Rocket players
HC Sparta Praha players
HC Vítkovice players
Sportspeople from Ostrava
Czech expatriate ice hockey players in Canada
Czech expatriate ice hockey players in Finland